Karol Chester "Chet" Tollstam (September 23, 1918 – December 27, 2003) was an American professional basketball player. He played in the National Basketball League for the Hammond Ciesar All-Americans during the 1940–41 season and averaged 2.9 points per game.

References 

1918 births
2003 deaths
American men's basketball players
Basketball players from Chicago
Centers (basketball)
DePaul Blue Demons men's basketball players
Forwards (basketball)
Hammond Ciesar All-Americans players